Beurs is a major subway interchange station in the center of Rotterdam. Underneath Churchill Square (Dutch: Churchillplein), the two lines through the city center (lines A-B-C and lines D-E) intersect. Passengers for Rotterdam Central Station change here to line D if they started their journey on line A, B, or C.

All destinations within the network are accessible from Beurs. Since December 2011, it has also been incorporated into the new RandstadRail network, resulting in a direct connection to The Hague (line E).

History
Station Beurs opened on 9 February 1968 on the North-South Line (also temporarily called Erasmuslijn). On 6 May 1982 a new station, Churchillplein, was opened nearby on the new East-West Line (also temporarily Calandlijn). Both stations were connected by an underground walkway. In 2000, this separate naming was abandoned. For a while, signs in the East-West Line-portion of the station still had 'Churchillplein' in a smaller font below 'Beurs', but this has recently been removed.

Rotterdam Metro stations
RandstadRail stations in Rotterdam
Railway stations opened in 1968
1968 establishments in the Netherlands
Railway stations in the Netherlands opened in the 20th century
Railway stations in the Netherlands opened in the 1960s